HMS Nereus was a  which served with the Royal Navy during the First World War. Launched in 1916, the vessel served with the Grand Fleet until the end of the conflict. The vessel operated as part for Thirteenth Destroyer Flotilla in support of convoy operations. In 1918, the flotilla took part in one of the last sorties of the war, although the British and German fleets did not meet and the destroyer returned without seeing any action. After the conflict, the destroyer was worn out by the demands of high speed operation in poor weather. Nereus was decommissioned and sold to be broken up in 1921 after less than six years service.

Design and development
Nereus was one of sixteen  destroyers ordered by the British Admiralty in September 1914 as part of the First War Construction Programme. The M-class was an improved version of the earlier  destroyers, required to reach a higher speed in order to counter rumoured German fast destroyers. It transpired that the German ships did not exist.

Power was provided by three oil fired Yarrow boilers each exhausting through three small funnels, which was a distinguishing feature of the class.

Armament consisted of three single QF  Mk IV guns on the ship's centreline, with one on the forecastle, one aft on a raised platform and one between the funnels. Torpedo armament consisted of two twin mounts for  torpedoes. A single QF 2-pounder  "pom-pom" anti-aircraft gun was mounted between the torpedo tubes. Nereus was equipped with two depth charge chutes aft for anti-submarine warfare. The ship had a complement of 80 officers and ratings.

Construction and career
Construction by John I. Thornycroft & Company of Woolston, Southampton was started when the hull was laid down during March 1915. Yard number 790 was allocated during construction. The ship was launched on 24 February and completed in May the following year.  The vessel was named after Nereus, a sea god in Greek mythology.

On entering service, Nereus joined the Grand Fleet as part of the Thirteenth Destroyer Flotilla based at Rosyth. The vessel operated in support of convoy operations. On 13 December, while forming part of a hunting group sent out to search for German warships that threatened convoys in the North Sea, the destroyer's forecastle was damaged by the sea conditions, leading to the entire flotilla being withdrawn. A similar operation took place between 1 and 10 October 1917. The flotilla also took part in the Royal Navy's engagement with one of the final sorties of the German High Seas Fleet during the First World War, on 24 April 1918, although the two fleets did not actually meet and the destroyer saw no action. The destroyer was later transferred to the Fourth Destroyer Flotilla based at Devonport.

The harsh conditions of wartime service, particularly the combination of high speed and the poor weather that is typical of the North Sea, exacerbated by the fact that the hull was not galvanised, meant that the destroyer was soon worn out. After the Armistice of 11 November 1918 that ended the war, the Royal Navy returned to a peacetime level of strength and both the number of ships and the amount of personnel needed to be reduced to save money. Nereus was initially moved to Nore and then reduced to Care and Maintenance at Chatham Dockyard on 10 October 1919. Decommissioned and sold to Cashmore of Newport on 15 November 1921, the destroyer was subsequently broken up July the following year. The ship's bell was retained and currently resides in the Imperial War Museum.

Pennant numbers

References

Citations

Bibliography

 
 
 
 
 
 
 
 
 
 
 
 
 

1916 ships
Admiralty M-class destroyers
Ships built in Southampton
World War I destroyers of the United Kingdom